Branko Cvejić (25 August 1946 – 26 July 2022) was a Serbian actor. He appeared in more than one hundred films from 1962 onwards.

Cvejić was director of the Yugoslav Drama Theatre.

sq:Branko Cvejić

Selected filmography

References

External links 

1946 births
2022 deaths
Male actors from Belgrade
Serbian male film actors
20th-century Serbian male actors
21st-century Serbian male actors
Serbian male television actors